Yulong Naxi Autonomous County is a county located in the northwest of Yunnan Province, China, bordering Sichuan Province to the northeast. It is the westernmost county-level division of the prefecture-level city of Lijiang. Wenhai village and lake along with Jade Dragon Snow Mountain are some of the famous scenic spots found here.

Administrative divisions
Yulong Naxi Autonomous County has 7 towns, 6 townships and 3 ethnic townships. 
7 towns

6 townships

3 ethnic townships
 Liming Lisu
 Shitou Bai
 Jiuhe Bai

References

External links

 Yulong County Official Site (Chinese)

 
County-level divisions of Lijiang
Nakhi people
Autonomous counties of the People's Republic of China